The Dubai Financial Market (DFM) is a stock exchange located in Dubai, United Arab Emirates. It was founded on 26 March 2000.

Overview
, there are 67 companies listed on DFM. Most of them are UAE-based companies and a few others are dual listings for companies based in other MENA region countries. Foreign companies are from the following countries: Kuwait, Bahrain, Oman, and Sudan. Many companies allow foreigners to own their shares.

During 2004 and 2005, there were significant increases in the volume of shares traded and the share prices of many companies. However, towards the end of 2005 and through the first few months of 2006 the bubble burst and share values dropped by around 60% on DFM, along with similar decreases in most other Persian Gulf stock markets.

DFM is one of three stock exchanges in the UAE. Abu Dhabi Securities Exchange (ADX) also lists mostly UAE companies and NASDAQ Dubai was set up to trade international stocks.

DFM and ADX are both governed and regulated by the Securities and Commodities Authority (SCA). SCA has the authority to impose laws and standards in which DFM and ADX have to comply with. SCA's role is to ensure that the laws are followed by the exchanges as well as to protect investors’, brokers’ and listed companies’ rights.

On the other hand, NASDAQ Dubai is governed to international standards by an independent regulator called the Dubai Financial Services Authority (DFSA), which is equivalent to the Securities and Exchange Commission in the United States. Unlike DFM and ADX, NASDAQ Dubai, located in Dubai International Financial Centre (DIFC), is an electronic exchange with no trading floor.

DFM was fully owned by the Government of Dubai until November 2006 when it turned into a public joint-stock company through an IPO, which led to sell 20% of its shares to the public and 80% were subscribed by Borse Dubai, which is owned by Dubai government. As a matter of fact, DFM's IPO has been oversubscribed by 118 times.

Like the revenue, DFM's net profit dropped sharply from the period ended 2007 till 2011. In 2007, DFM profits reached 1,439.6 million including none operational profits coming from IPO of AED 468 million. In 2008, profits were AED 605 million. The next year, in 2009, the profit dropped even further and reached 346.62. In 2010, another drop took place and profits reached AED 79 million. In 2011, DFM recorded a loss of AED 6.45 million. From the trend, one can imply that the situation is not improving, but is deteriorating year after year. DFM BOD members, executives, and managers are working hard to get out DFM from this unforeseen dilemma.
Due to the consistent efforts of the DFM BOD members and management team, DFM was able to turn over the situation in 2013 and gain a +608.5% growth in net profits, to become AED 285 million from the AED 35 million in the previous year. and the following year the market have occurred profits of AED 759 million with a growth rate of 166.3%. The next three years the market saw a sharp decline in profit to hit AED 233.5 million in 2017.

Listed companies

Banks

Emirates Bank International (EBI) and National Bank of Dubai (NBD) had been merged to form a holding company to run both entities named Emirates National Bank of Dubai (ENBD), this merger resulted in cancelling both shares and issuing a new one listed on the October 16, 2007.

Both AMLAK and TAMWEEL were suspended from trading since the November 23, 2008 as they announced a merger action.

Investment and financial services

Insurance

As of July 27, 2009, the trading symbol for the Islamic Arab Insurance company (IAIC) will be changed into SALAMA.

Real estate and construction

Transportation

Industrials

Consumer staples

Telecommunications

Services

Also, those securities listed on NASDAQ Dubai are included on the exchange.

See also
 List of company registers

References

External links

Financial services companies established in 2000
2000 establishments in the United Arab Emirates
Companies based in Dubai
Stock exchanges in the United Arab Emirates
Economy of Dubai